Karl David Sebastian Dencik (born 31 October 1974) is a Danish-Swedish actor. He has acted in both Swedish and Danish films, and has also had major roles in English-language films and series including Tinker Tailor Soldier Spy (2011), The Girl with the Dragon Tattoo (2011), Top of the Lake (2017), McMafia (2018), Chernobyl (2019), and the James Bond film No Time to Die (2021).

Dencik is a two-time Robert Award winner, for Best Actor in a Leading Role for A Soap (2006) and Robert Award for Best Actor in a Supporting Television Role for The Chestnut Man (2021). He won a Guldbagge Award for Best Supporting Actor for The Perfect Patient (2019). He is also a seven-time Bodil Award nominee.

Early life
Dencik was born in Stockholm, Sweden. His family moved to Denmark when he was very young. As a teenager, he spent his youth studying in Brazil, where he discovered Capoeira, the Brazilian martial art that combines elements of dance and music. The dance aspect of Capoeira made him take an interest in theatre. He later moved back to Sweden and attended the Stockholm Academy of Dramatic Arts. His wife is a lawyer who works in Copenhagen. He uses Denmark as his base, but since his work takes him to Sweden he also has an apartment in Stockholm.

Career 
After having had minor roles in different films, David Dencik became an established actor in Sweden for his role as the killer John Ausonius in the three-part TV mini-series Lasermannen in 2005.

In 2006, he starred in the comedy Everything About My Bush (known as Allt om min buske in Swedish). In 2007, he appeared in the Danish feature film Daisy Diamond directed by Simon Staho.

He portrayed Fred Åkerström in the biographical film Cornelis, starring Hank Von Helvete as Cornelis Vreeswijk. In 2011, he appeared in the Hollywood-adaption of The Girl with the Dragon Tattoo and played Toby Esterhase in the film Tinker Tailor Soldier Spy. He also starred in the gay-themed Brotherhood and the Dimension Films thriller Regression. In 2017 he played brothel owner Alexander "Puss" Braun, in Jane Campion's acclaimed Top of the Lake. McMafia (2018) saw Dencik play Russian Boss, Uncle Boris Godman, inspired by the book McMafia: A Journey Through the Global Criminal Underworld (2008) by journalist Misha Glenny. Dencik then portrayed a rogue scientist Valdo Obruchev in the James Bond film No Time to Die (2021).

Selected filmography

Film

Television

References

External links

 
 

1974 births
Living people
Danish Jews
Jewish Danish actors
Danish male actors
Swedish Jews
Male actors from Stockholm
Swedish people of Czechoslovak descent